The Kirnitzsch (German), in Bohemia also called the Kirnischt, is a right tributary of the River Elbe, which passes through the Czech Republic and the German state of Saxony.

Geography 
The Kirnitzsch, also called the Kirnscht or Kirnsch in the local dialect, rises in the Lusatian Highlands in Bohemia west of the village of Studánka (German Schönborn) and flows westwards through the town of Krásná Lípa (Schönlinde). The wild, romantic valley is also called the Khaatal (Kyjovske údoli) (Khaa valley).

On the site of the former village of  Hinterdaubitz, demolished after 1945, the border stream of Weißbach empties into the Kirnitzsch, which, from this point, forms the border between the Czech Republic and Saxony. Further downstream the Kirnitzsch is first impounded at the Obere Schleuse ("Upper Lock") so that boating can take place on the stream.

These places, too, no longer exist. From here the Kirnitzsch flows through Saxon Switzerland, where it is impounded again at the Niedere Schleuse ("Lower Lock"). Shortly thereafter the Kirnitzsch enters the narrow Kirnitzsch Valley (Kirnitzschtal). After another  it discharges into the Elbe at Bad Schandau. Over its last few kilometres it is followed by the Kirnitzschtal tramway that runs parallel to the Kirnitzsch.

See also 
List of rivers of the Czech Republic
List of rivers of Saxony

Sources 
 Wieland Büttner: Die Buschmühle im Kirnitzschtal. in: Petra Binder (Hg.): Vom Berg zum Tal - Wasser, die zur Elbe fließen. Landkalenderbuch für die Sächsische Schweiz und das Osterzgebirge 2009. Schütze-Engler-Weber-Verlag, Dresden 2008, S. 94–94, .
 Andreas Laube: Die Errichtung der Verkehrswege und die Beförderung von Reisenden im Kirnitzschtal von Schandau nach dem Großen Wasserfall. in: Petra Binder (Hg.): Auf Straßen, Schienen und Wegen. Landkalenderbuch 2011 für die Sächsische Schweiz und das Osterzgebirge. Schütze-Engler-Weber-Verlag, Dresden 2010, S. 130–138, 
 Manfred Schober: Flößerei auf der Kirnitzsch. In: Petra Binder (Hg.): Vom Berg zum Tal - Wasser, die zur Elbe fließen. Landkalenderbuch für die Sächsische Schweiz und das Osterzgebirge 2009. Schütze-Engler-Weber-Verlag, Dresden 2008, S. 23–28, .

References

External links 

Rivers of the Ústí nad Labem Region
Rivers of Saxony
Bodies of water of Saxon Switzerland
International rivers of Europe
Sebnitz
Bad Schandau
Rivers of Germany
Czech Republic–Germany border
Border rivers